Thayi Illada Thabbali  is a 2003 Indian Kannada-language drama film written and directed by Om Sai Prakash. The film was produced by Ramesh Yadav under the banner Royal Pictures. It features Shivadwaj and Radhika . The supporting cast includes Srinivasamurthy, Avinash, Rajesh, Sadashiva Brahmavar, Bhavya . The score and soundtrack for the film is by Nadabrahma Hamsalekha  and the cinematography is by Sundarnath Suvarna. Radhika received Karnataka State Award for Best Actress for her performance and she also received nomination for Filmfare Award for Best Actress - Kannada

Cast 

 Shivadhwaj as Shivakumar 
 Radhika as Gowri 
 Srinivasa Murthy as Basava 
 Avinash as Nanjappa 
 Rajesh
 Bhavya
 Ashalatha as Parvathi 
 Chithra Shenoy
 M N Lakshmidevi
 Jyothi 
 Smitha 
 Sadhu Kokila
 Bank Janardhan
 Michel Madhu
 Umesh
 Sadashiva Brahmavar

Soundtrack 

The film's background score and soundtrack were composed and written by Nadabrahma Hamsalekha. The music rights were acquired by Akash Audio.

Awards
Radhika won Best Actress award in 2003–04 Karnataka State Film Awards.

References 

2000s Kannada-language films
Indian family films
Indian drama films
2003 drama films
2003 films
Films directed by Sai Prakash